Atrapado, luchando por un sueño is a 2022 Peruvian drama film directed by Pedro Ramírez Ugarte (in his directorial debut) and written by Ugarte & Julissa Horna. It stars Vincenzo Leonardi, Christopher Moreno, Desirée Durán and Daniella Arroyo.

Synopsis 
The film narrates, through flashbacks or memories, the dramatic events in Mateo's childhood, which end up destroying his family and dragging the protagonist down a dark, negative, and lonely path.

Cast 
The actors participating in this film are:

 Christopher Moreno as Mateo
 Vincenzo Leonardi
 Giselle Collao
 José Luis Ruiz
 Cati Caballero
 Pelo D’Ambrosio
 Fernando Petong
 Jean Paul Strauss
 Fernando Pasco
 “Pantera” Zegarra

Release 
It premiered on May 26, 2022 in Bolivian theaters. It premiered on September 16, 2022 in Peruvian theaters.

References 

2022 films
2022 drama films
Peruvian drama films
2020s Peruvian films
2020s Spanish-language films
Films set in Peru
Films shot in Peru
Films about poverty
Films about violence
2022 directorial debut films